La Contessa Valentina Allegra de la Fontaine is a fictional character appearing in American comic books published by Marvel Comics. Created by writer-artist Jim Steranko, she first appeared in the "Nick Fury, Agent of S.H.I.E.L.D." feature in Strange Tales #159 (August 1967).

Lisa Rinna portrayed the character in the 1998 film Nick Fury: Agent of S.H.I.E.L.D., and Julia Louis-Dreyfus portrays Fontaine in the Marvel Cinematic Universe, appearing in the Disney+ series The Falcon and the Winter Soldier (2021), and the films Black Widow (2021), Black Panther: Wakanda Forever (2022), and the upcoming film Thunderbolts (2024).

Publication history
The Contessa appeared prominently throughout creator Jim Steranko's run of the Nick Fury, Agent of S.H.I.E.L.D. feature that ran through Strange Tales #168 (May 1968) and in the same-name comic-book series that began the following month.

An agent who threw S.H.I.E.L.D. chief Nick Fury for a loop upon their initial meeting, she quickly became his love interest, and was featured in a silent, one-page seduction sequence in Nick Fury, Agent of S.H.I.E.L.D. #2 that famously had two panels changed, at the behest of the Comics Code Authority. In the third-to-last panel, de facto Marvel art director John Romita, Sr. redrew a telephone that had been taken off the hook for privacy, placing the receiver back in the cradle; in the last panel, an image was removed and replaced with a closeup of an item from earlier in the page — a phallic long-barreled gun in a holster:

The story was reprinted as published in Nick Fury Special Edition #1 (Dec. 1983). When reprinted again, in Nick Fury, Agent of S.H.I.E.L.D.: Who Is Scorpio? (Marvel Enterprises, 2001), however, Steranko's original final panel was reinserted. In a black-and-white long shot with screentone shading, the couple is beginning to embrace, with Fury standing and the Contessa on one knee, getting up.

Fictional character biography
Contessa Valentina Allegra de la Fontaine was a member of the European jet set and a citizen of Italy. After both her parents were killed for aiding some unspecified resistance movement, the Contessa found her life meaningless. Desiring to carry on in their places so their deaths would not be in vain, she eventually was contacted by the international espionage agency S.H.I.E.L.D. and entered a training program to become an agent.<ref>Strange Tales #162, "So Evil, the Night p.3, panel 6. Marvel Comics.</ref>

She first encountered its executive director, Nick Fury, aboard S.H.I.E.L.D.'s airborne headquarters, the Helicarrier, toward the end of her training, impressing Fury by tossing him head-over-heels with a judo throw after his uttering an untoward remark about female agents. The two eventually became lovers, and their relationship continued for many years.

As a result of the Contessa's remarkable talents and skills in many areas, she quickly became a leading member of S.H.I.E.L.D. She was also at one point appointed as the leader of S.H.I.E.L.D.'s Femme Force.

She was eventually reassigned to the position of S.H.I.E.L.D. Liaison to the United Kingdom.  In that capacity, she was tasked with providing support to British superhero Union Jack, Israeli superhero Sabra, and Saudi superhero Arabian Knight in thwarting a Radically Advanced Ideas in Destruction (RAID) terrorist attack on London, England.  Shortly thereafter, she worked with Commodore Lance Hunter and Alistaire Stuart on creating the British version of the Superhuman Registration Act.  She then met with Joseph Hauer, Pete Wisdom, Captain Britain, and Union Jack to brief them on the Act's ramifications on the British superhuman population.

At some point, Valentina Allegra de Fontaine approached Amanda Armstrong where she informed her that her late father was an agent of S.H.I.E.L.D. She accepted Valentina's offer while using her band as a cover for her double life.

Secret Invasion
It is revealed that shortly after the Secret War, a Skrull agent posed as Contessa de la Fontaine in order to spy on Nick Fury and learn as many secrets as possible. However, Fury grew suspicious and killed the agent, who then reverted to her true shape, thus revealing the Invasion to Fury.

After the death of Captain America, a second impostor posing as the Contessa approached Dum Dum Dugan with the intent of learning the location of Fury, whom the Skrulls are seeking. After he reveals he does not know, the impostor stabs Dugan with claws resembling those of the X-Man, Wolverine. After Dugan's body is thrown into the ocean, the impostor takes his place.

Secret Warriors
Both Dugan and the Contessa are later shown alive and healthy. They are freed from captivity along with the other humans kidnapped and replaced by Skrulls.

In the premiere of the Secret Warriors series, where Nick Fury is fighting back against Norman Osborn's H.A.M.M.E.R., it is shown Hydra has always controlled S.H.I.E.L.D., right from the start. Fontaine becomes the new Madame Hydra, and is revealed to have been a Russian mole recruited into S.H.I.E.L.D. She is working for the formerly Soviet espionage group called Leviathan. This betrayal is known to Fury, who is working on bringing down Hydra and Leviathan. Fontaine kills the current Madame Hydra, who is revived in a new form. After her defeat, Nick Fury tries to rescue Contessa from jail.

In the pages of the "Ravencroft" miniseries, Valentina is seen as a member of J.A.N.U.S., a group that wanted to utilize the super-human potential inside the Ravencroft medical facility for their own ends.

Other versions
MC2
In the alternate universe MC2 imprint, the Contessa is a S.H.I.E.L.D. agent who encounters Spider-Girl. The two came into conflict with each other and with the United States government over the inherent dangers of the Carnage symbiote.

Ultimate Marvel
In the Ultimate Marvel Universe, Valentina Allegra de la Fontaine is the chairman of the OXE Group, currently the largest holding company in the World. She is part of the secret Kratos Club, a group of industrial multimillionaires whose goal is to use their influence to ensure that the right things get done, no matter what.

Earth X
In recent history leading up to Earth X, she was still an active member of S.H.I.E.L.D. when Norman Osborn takes control of the United States of America. When Nick Fury refused to deal with Osborn, Osborn had created the parasitic Hydra creatures from information he gained from the Bloodstone files. The Hydra were sent to attack and take down SHIELD's helicarrier, causing it to crash. Many S.H.I.E.L.D. agents, Contessa among them, were transformed into host bodies for the Hydra organism.

Like all people infected with the Hydra, Contessa was killed and her body usurped by the Hydra parasite that clings to the chest of her body. While her soul was transported to the Realm of the Dead where it would relive moments of her history, her physical body became a member of the Hydra group led by the "Madam Hydra" which controlled the body of She-Hulk.

Most Hydra's ended up in New York, where they would be seemingly killed by the Skull's invading army, however the group would survive and return to a secret base. There, the Hydra would be banished to Limbo by Captain America, who armed with Rom's blaster.

Contessa's soul would be inducted in Mar-Vel's army of the dead in a final battle against Death, Thanos, and Mephisto. Later she would be granted a place in Mar-Vel's Paradise, following this her current whereabouts are unknown.Universe X #11. Marvel Comics.

Mutant X
In Mutant X, the Contessa is an agent of S.H.I.E.L.D. who fought Havok and the Six on Liberty Island when S.H.I.E.L.D. planned to release the Legacy Virus which would kill all super-powered life.

In other media
Television
Valentina Allegra de Fontaine makes a non-speaking cameo appearance in The Avengers: Earth's Mightiest Heroes episode "Winter Soldier". This version was a member of Nick Fury's squadron before it was taken out by the Winter Soldier.

Film
Valentina Allegra de Fontaine appears in Nick Fury: Agent of S.H.I.E.L.D., portrayed by Lisa Rinna.

Marvel Cinematic Universe
Valentina Allegra de Fontaine appears in media set in the Marvel Cinematic Universe, portrayed by Julia Louis-Dreyfus. In an article published in Vanity Fair, it was revealed Louis-Dreyfus was supposed to make her first appearance as De Fontaine in the film Black Widow (2021) before it was delayed due to the COVID-19 pandemic.
 De Fontaine first appears in the Disney+ miniseries The Falcon and the Winter Soldier (2021). In the episode "Truth", she approaches John Walker after he is stripped of the mantle of Captain America following his killing a member of the Flag Smashers. She expresses sympathy for his situation and tells him that the people she works for may have use for his services. In the series finale "One World, One People", she meets with Walker once more to give him a new suit and dubs him "U.S. Agent".
 De Fontaine appears in a post-credits scene for Black Widow, where she hires Yelena Belova to kill Clint Barton, whom she claims is responsible for the death of Belova's sister, Natasha Romanoff.
 De Fontaine appears in the film Black Panther: Wakanda Forever (2022). It is revealed that she is the new director of the CIA and the ex-wife of Everett K. Ross.
 Louis-Dreyfus will reprise her role as De Fontaine in the upcoming film Thunderbolts'' (2024).

See also
 List of S.H.I.E.L.D. members

References

External links
 Valentina Allegra de Fontaine at Marvel Wiki

Characters created by Jim Steranko
Comics characters introduced in 1967
Fictional counts and countesses
Fictional female secret agents and spies
Fictional Italian people
Fictional special forces personnel
Hydra (comics) agents
Marvel Comics martial artists
Marvel Comics military personnel
S.H.I.E.L.D. agents